The Large, the Small, and the Human Mind is a popular science book by British theoretical physicist Roger Penrose.  The book was published by Cambridge University Press in 1997.

Overview
The book includes criticism of his work on physics and consciousness by Abner Shimony, Nancy Cartwright, and Stephen Hawking. The book was preceded by The Emperor's New Mind, published in 1989, and Shadows of the Mind, published in 1994.

References

1997 non-fiction books
Cambridge University Press books
Works by Roger Penrose